Leith Corporation Tramways operated a passenger tramway service in Leith between 1904 and 1920.

History

On 23 October 1904, Leith Corporation Tramways took over operation of the Edinburgh Street Tramways routes within the corporation district. The electrification and modernisation was undertaken immediately, and the first electric service ran on 18 August 1905.

The fleet livery was munich lake and ivory.

Passengers going from Leith to Edinburgh had to change trams (from electric to cable-drawn) at Pilrig on Leith Walk at the boundary between Leith and Edinburgh. This confused exchange of passengers was known locally as "the Pilrig muddle", and lasted until the electrification of the Edinburgh Corporation Tramways system.

Takeover and closure

The services were taken over by Edinburgh Corporation Tramways on 10 November 1920 and continued to operate until 1956.

References

External links
 Leith Corporation Tramways at the British Tramway Company Badges and Buttons website'

Tram transport in Scotland
Edinburgh Trams
Transport in Edinburgh
History of Leith
1904 establishments in Scotland
1920 disestablishments in Scotland